Charles Farr (c. 1812 – 25 February 1888) was a timber merchant and builder in the young colony of South Australia.

History

Farr emigrated to South Australia from Britain aboard D'Auvergne arriving in March 1839.

Farr, by trade a bricklayer, had premises on Hindley Street, and by 1850 owned a business on Franklin Street, a timber yard possibly purchased from Philip Santo.
By 1868 he employed up to 115 men and his sawmill and timber yard, which employed around 35 men, extended over two acres between Franklin and Grote streets, and included the Farr residence.
He later moved to Waymouth Street, then in 1883 moved to Grote Street, west of Brown Street.
That same year he had a timber yard in Wakefield Street.

His two sons, who were educated at  J. L. Young's Adelaide Educational Institution, were brought into the business, but later went their separate ways: Charles George was licensee of the Talbot Hotel, Gouger Street, then the International Hotel, Rundle Street; Alfred was city manager for Walter & Morris, who owned the Sarnia timber mills in Port Adelaide, and influential president of the Builders and Contractors' Association.

Farr died after several years an invalid. His remains were interred in the West Terrace Cemetery.

He evidently had good relations with the men in his employ, and paid skilled tradesmen slightly more than other employers; from 8/6d to 10s. per day.
For twenty years his company was probably second only to English & Brown / Brown & Thompson, who owned the Glen Ewin quarry.

Some works

Family
Farr married Sophia Morris (c. 1813 – 19 March 1879) before leaving for South Australia. Their children were:
Charlotte Farr (c. February 1839 – 4 September 1866) married Harry Bickford (1843–1927) on 24 February 1866. They had no children. He married again, on 10 March 1870 to Rosina Mary Ferguson (1845 – 5 October 1898). There was a dispute over a North Adelaide block given to Charlotte by Farr.
Sophia Farr (1843 – 30 June 1918) died at the home of her sister Martha Laurence
Charles George Farr (1845 –  1 April 1908) married Paruna Minnie Ann "Mina" Russell (c. 1863 – 4 August 1940) on 26 June 1879
Alfred Farr (1847 – 29 May 1912) married Mary Prynn Sands ( – 7 March 1903) in 1865, lived on Hurtle Square. He married again in 1905 to Ann McInnes, died at Jaffrey Street, Parkside.
Alfred John Farr ( – 1938) married Mary Lucy Greayer ( – ) on 20 May 1907
Martha Farr (1849– ) married Walter Laurence ( – ) on 8 February 1871
Walter James Laurence (1883–1907)
Eliza Farr (1851 – 10 January 1930) died at Napier Terrace, Hawthorn
They had a home on Franklin Street, and from around 1880 on Grove Street, Unley Park, where he died. This residence may have previously been the property of Dugald Herschel Babbage.

References 

1813 births
1888 deaths
Australian builders
Australian timber merchants
19th-century Australian businesspeople